

Wulfsige was a medieval Archbishop of York.

Wulfsige was consecrated sometime after 808 and he died between 830 and 837.

Citations

References

External links
 

Archbishops of York
9th-century archbishops